The Primal Call is a 1911 American short silent romance film directed by D. W. Griffith, starring Wilfred Lucas and featuring Blanche Sweet.

Cast
 Wilfred Lucas as The Fisherman
 Claire McDowell as The Woman
 Grace Henderson as The Woman's Mother
 Dell Henderson as The Creditor
 Joseph Graybill as The Millionaire
 John T. Dillon as The Millionaire's Friend / At Club (as Jack Dillon)
 Vivian Prescott as The Millionaire's Girlfriend
 Donald Crisp
 Blanche Sweet	
 Kate Toncray as The Woman's Maid

See also
 D. W. Griffith filmography
 Blanche Sweet filmography

References

External links

1911 films
1910s romance films
1911 short films
American romance films
American silent short films
Biograph Company films
American black-and-white films
Films directed by D. W. Griffith
1910s American films